Sarah Kachingwe (née Chavunduka; 1936–2012) was a Zimbabwean politician and activist. She is the first black female to enroll at the University College of Rhodesia in 1957. She went on to become the secretary for Information, Posts and Telecommunications and also to serve on the board of Zimpapers and the Forestry Commission.

Biography
Kachingwe was born in the Rusape, Zimbabwe, in 1936. She attended Goromonzi High School. In 1957 she enrolled in the University College of Rhodesia, becoming the first black woman to do so. She graduated with a bachelor of arts degree in English and History.

Kachingwe died at her home in Greendale, Harare, in 2012 from complications related to heart disease. Her funeral was attended by, among others, Deputy Prime Minister Professor Arthur Mutambara and Malawi's ambassador to Zimbabwe Dr Richard Mpoya. She was laid to rest at Harare's Greendale Cemetery.

Legacy
At her funeral, Deputy Prime Minister Arthur Mutambara presented the Flag of Zimbabwe to Mrs Kachingwe's husband to symbolize her status as a "liberation war heroine".

References

1936 births
2012 deaths
20th-century Zimbabwean women politicians
20th-century Zimbabwean politicians
Alumni of University of London Worldwide
Alumni of the University of London
University of Zimbabwe alumni
Zimbabwean activists